"Anxiety" is a song by American singer Julia Michaels featuring guest vocals from Selena Gomez, from her fourth EP, Inner Monologue Part 1 (2019). The song was written by Michaels, Gomez, Scott Harris, and its producer Ian Kirkpatrick. It was sent to Australian radio on January 24, 2019 as the lead single from the EP and was the most added song the week after its release.

Background and composition

In an interview with Zane Lowe, Michaels said "I was like, 'I think it'd be really awesome to have a song with two women on it that struggle with the same thing, that are talking about something other than two women fighting for a guy's attention, or something like that. It's almost like a female empowerment song without it being a female empowerment song". Upon its release, Gomez said on Instagram: "This song is really close to my heart as I've experienced anxiety and I know a lot of my friends do too."

"Anxiety" lyrically chronicles struggles with mental health. Musically, it is composed of "snaps and a razor-sharp guitar", as well as "an upbeat acoustic lick and earworm of a melody". Gomez and Michaels "trade cleverly arranged verses about the often-isolating experience of anxiety and depression".

Critical reception
Paul Fletcher from iHeart Radio said "The track is centered around a plucky acoustic guitar part that settles into a slick pop groove. Both Michaels and Gomez offer endearingly frank verses about grappling with depression and social anxiety, though their lyrics are also tinged with a bit of self-deprecating humor." Ashley Iasimone, writing for Billboard, called the single "poignant".

Charts

Certifications

Release history

References

External links
 

2018 songs
2019 singles
Julia Michaels songs
Selena Gomez songs
Songs about anxiety
Song recordings produced by Ian Kirkpatrick (record producer)
Songs written by Ian Kirkpatrick (record producer)
Songs written by Julia Michaels
Songs written by Scott Harris (songwriter)
Songs written by Selena Gomez
Female vocal duets